Breaking Laces is an American acoustic-rock band formed in Brooklyn, New York.

The band consists of Willem Hartong (lead vocals, guitar, principal lyricist), Rob Chojnacki (bass, keyboards, backing vocals) and Seth Masarsky (drums, programming, production). Its music has been described as acoustic rock, alternative rock, indie rock and indie pop, and is known for "honest songwriting"  that combines widescreen songcraft with personally charged lyrical intimacy. Breaking Laces has released five albums and five EPs since its inception in 2003. Their recordings from 2007 to 2013 are currently being remixed by Masarsky for deluxe edition digital releases. The originals are temporarily unavailable digitally outside of select mp3 streams via their website.

History
The band originally began as a basement project by Hartong, who recorded and released a pair of well-received D.I.Y. albums 2003's Sohcahtoa and its acoustic companion, Operation Income on his own. Hartong then joined with kindred spirit, Seth Masarsky, later adding bassist Rob Chojnacki, with whom Masarsky had played previously in the band Darby Jones. Extensive touring followed and in 2005 they recorded their first album, Lemonade, together. The early works were received to much critical acclaim and spurred multiple tours overseas. This album was followed by the six-song 2006 EP Astronomy Is My Life, But I Love You and 2009's full-length Live at Seaside Studios. The band became well known for their jaw-dropping live shows, and was named best live band in NYC by the New York Post and the Village Voice multiple times.

Since its inception, the band has played well over 2000 shows, including several tours overseas.

In 2011, the band teamed with Nashville based Tenacity Records and released When You Find Out. They continued to tour extensively and released the album "Come Get Some" in October 2012. Many believe the last official studio album to be their crowning achievement.  Breaking Laces recorded in some of the best studios in the US, as well as their own studio in New Jersey.

An independent band at heart, they would release free singles and EP’s online and give limited CD prints away at shows. They accumulated an immense amount of unreleased original material as well as extensive live recordings that became known as “The Laces Vault” on social media.  Masarsky, currently an award winning music producer has vowed to ready and release never before available full length albums digitally in 2021 through 2023, which would mark their 20 year anniversary.

The band announced a “probably forever for now hiatus” via Twitter and their website in October 2013. While fans worldwide were saddened to hear the news, the band gave them one last laugh and announced it in true Breaking Laces style stating-"Unable to cite musical differences, drug abuse or psychotic meltdowns, Breaking Laces is simply amicably moving on to pursue new endeavors. We want to wholeheartedly thank everybody who has joined us on our journey over the past decade and supported us in any and every way. Seriously, we can't thank you enough and will always have fond memories of our treks across the globe, the legacy of music that was made, and everybody who we came into contact with."

Origin of band name
According to Hartong, the name Breaking Laces comes from the many times the band had been kicked out of clubs for wearing sneakers.

Members
 Willem Hartong – vocals, guitar
 Rob Chojnacki – bass, keyboards, backing vocals
 Seth Masarsky – drums, programming, percussion, album producer

Discography

 God In Training (EP, 2003)
 Sohcahtoa (2003)
 Operation Income (2003)
 Not From Concentrate (EP, 2005)
 Lemonade (2005)
 Astronomy Is My Life, But I Love You (EP, 2006)
 Live At Seaside (2009)
 What We Need (EP, 2010)
 When You Find Out (2011)
 Come Get Some (October 30, 2012)

See also

 Culture of Brooklyn
 List of alternative-rock artists
 List of bands formed in New York
 List of indie-pop artists
 List of indie-rock musicians
 Music of New York City

References

External links
 , the band's official website
 
 Discography on Billboard.com

2002 establishments in New York City
Alternative rock groups from New York (state)
American pop rock music groups
Indie pop groups from New York (state)
Indie rock musical groups from New York (state)
Musical groups established in 2002
Musical groups from Brooklyn